Asma Agbarieh-Zahalka (born 1973) is an Israeli Arab journalist and political activist who heads the Organization for Democratic Action (Da'am) party. She is the only Israeli Arab woman to head a political party.

Biography
Agbarieh was born to a conservative Muslim family and raised in Jaffa. In 1995, after completing her undergraduate studies at Tel Aviv University in Arabic literature and in education and teaching, she started work as an editor for al-Sabar, the Arabic-language edition of the magazine Etgar (challenge) published by the newly founded Da'am party. She joined the party and became active in its socio-political activities, focusing on the city’s housing shortage, quality of education, and the status of women.

In 2000, she founded and became the director of the East Jerusalem branch of the  Workers’ Advice Center - 'Ma’an', which provides assistance to non-unionized workers and the unemployed. In 2002, she relocated to the Ma'an branch in the Triangle, where she worked on projects aimed at finding employment for laborers and the unemployed in various fields, and in youth education, as well as a project to help those affected by the Wisconsin Project.

Political career
She was a candidate for Da'am in the elections for the 2003 elections, and headed its list for the 2006, 2009 and 2013 elections. The party failed to cross the electoral threshold on all three occasions, winning no seats. 

In November 2008 she ran for mayor of Tel Aviv-Yafo and a seat on its city council. The party received 0.45% of the ballots, which fell below the threshold percentage.

Personal life
She is married to actor and contractor Musa Zahalka. The couple has an infant son, born in January 2009, to whom they gave the universalistic name Adam.

Despite her upbringing, she is now critical of Islam due to perceived restrictions on women as well as aspects of Sharia. She is an atheist.

References

External links

Arab leader of workers' party: Israel is no longer state of Jews, but of wealthy Haaretz, 3 February 2009
An Arab Woman Running for Mayor of Tel 4/4/2008 "Tel Aviv" the weekly supplement of Ydiouot Ahronot. Published in English by Monthly Review

1974 births
Living people
21st-century Israeli women politicians
Arab atheists
Arab politicians in Israel
Da'am Workers Party politicians
Former Muslim critics of Islam
Israeli atheists
Israeli feminists
Israeli former Muslims
Leaders of political parties in Israel
People from Jaffa
Politicians from Tel Aviv
Tel Aviv University alumni
Palestinian atheists
Palestinian feminists